The 1965 World Table Tennis Championships women's singles was the 28th edition of the women's singles championship.
Naoko Fukatsu defeated Lin Hui-ching in the final by three sets to two, to win the title.

Seeds

  Maria Alexandru
  Ella Constantinescu
  Masako Seki
  Noriko Yamanaka
  Han Ju-chen
  Naoko Fukatsu
  Lin Hui-ching
  Éva Kóczián-Földy
  Liang Li-chen
  Mary Shannon
  Li Ho-nan
  Ti Chiang-hua
  Erzsebet Jurik
  Diane Rowe
  L'i Li-fen 
  Cheng Min-chih 
  Zoja Rudnova 
  Edit Buchholz 
  Svetlana Grinberg

Results

See also
List of World Table Tennis Championships medalists

References

-
1965 in women's table tennis